The following is a list of notable people from Bjelovar and the geographical area corresponding to present-day Bjelovar-Bilogora County, Croatia.

Artists, musicians and actors

 Momčilo Bajagić Bajaga (born 1960), rock musician
 Vojin Bakić (1915-1992), sculptor
 Dragomir Čumić (1937-2013), actor
 Tošo Dabac (1907-1970), photographer
 Bogdan Diklić (born 1952), actor
 Eva Fischer (1920-2015), actress
 Sonja Kovač (born 1984), actress
 Velko Milojevic (Charles Millot) (1921-2003), actor
 Edo Murtić (1921-2005), painter
 Bojan Navojec (born 1976), actor
 Goran Navojec (born 1970), actor and musician
 Mario Petreković (born 1972), actor
 Ivo Robić (1923-2000), singer
 Ferdo Rusan (1810-1879), reformer, composer and musician
 Ivo Serdar (1933-1985), actor
 Zdenko Strižić (1902-1990), architect, urban planner, and teacher
 Snježana Tribuson (born 1957), screenwriter and film director

Authors

 Slavko Kolar (1891-1963), writer
 Mato Lovrak (1899-1974), children's literature writer
 Milena Mrazović (1863-1927), journalist, writer
 Josip Novakovich (born 1956), writer
 Đuro Sudeta (1903-1927), writer
 Janus Pannonius (1434-1472) poet, diplomat and Bishop of Pécs
 Goran Tribuson (born 1948), prose and screenplay writer
 Ivan Trnski (1819-1910), writer, translator and 7th President of Matica hrvatska

Military leaders

 Vilko Begić (1874-1947), military officer
 Ivo Herenčić (1910-1978), leader in the Independent State of Croatia
 Károly Knezić (1808-1849), honvéd general in the Hungarian Army
 Branko Krga (born 1945), military officer and Serbia's Chief of the General Staff
 Marko Mesić (1901-1982) decorated gunnery officer

Politicians

 Đurđa Adlešič (born 1960), politician
 Milivoj Ašner (1913-2011) Independent State of Croatia's police officer who was number 4 on the Simon Wiesenthal Center's list of most wanted Nazi war criminals and on the Interpol's most wanted list
 Vesna Bedeković (born 1966), politician who served as the Minister of Demographics, Family, Youth and Social Policy of Croatia
 Boris Buzančić (1929-2014), actor, politician, mayor of Zagreb
 Slavko Cuvaj (1851-1931), politician, Ban of Kingdom of Croatia-Slavonia
 Silvije Degen (born 1942), politician and lawyer
 Gordan Jandroković (born 1967), politician and diplomat, 12th Speaker of the Croatian Parliament, Minister of Foreign and European Affairs
 Julije Makanec (1904-1945), politician
 Anka Mrak-Taritaš (born 1959), politician, Minister of Construction and Spatial Planning and President of the Civic Liberal Alliance

Historians and scientists
 Zvonimir Janko (1932–2022), mathematician
 Željko Karaula (born 1973), historian
 Božidar Puretić (1921-1971), physician
 Branko Souček (1930-2014), pioneer of Croatian computer science
 Đuro Šurmin (1867-1937), literary historian and politician
 Hrvoje Tkalčić (born 1970), geophysicist and professor at the Australian National University in Canberra.

Athletes 

 Mirko Bašić, handball player who won several medals representing Yugoslavia, including a gold at the 1984 Summer Olympics
 Luka Božić (born 1996), basketball player
 Dario Čanađija (born 1994), football player
 Zvonko Canjuga (born 1921), football player
 Zdravko Ceraj (1920-2011) who competed for SFR Yugoslavia in the 1952 Summer Olympics. and won two medals at the Mediterranean Games
 Zdravko Divjak (born 1956), swimmer who competed at the 1976 Summer Olympics
 Bogumir Doležal(1889-1959), footballer, sportsman and journalist
 Bojan Đurković (born 1989), sports shooter
 Mladen Frančić (born 1955), footballer
 Petar Gorša (born 1988), sports shooter
 Ivan Gubijan (1923-2009), hammer thrower, won a silver medal at the 1948 Summer Olympics
 Hrvoje Horvat (born 1946), handball player who won several medals with Yugoslavia
 Hrvoje Horvat, Jr. (born 1977), handball player and coach
 Franjo Jurjević (born 1932), gymnast
 Bojan Knežević (born 1997), football player
 Darko Kralj (born 1971), paralympic athlete, won a gold medal at Beijing 2008
 Zvezdan Ljubobratović (born 1971), footballer
 Zdravko Mamić (born 1959), football administrator and sports manager
 Zoran Mamić (born 1971), football player and coach
 Alen Maras (born 1982), footballer
 Miran Maričić (born 1997), sports shooter
 Alen Mrzlečki (born 1974), footballer
 Filip Ozobić (born 1991), footballer who played for Croatia's national football team
 Božidar Peter (1938-2012), handball player who played with Yugoslavia's national team
 Miroslav Pribanić (born 1946), handball player who was part of the Yugoslav national team that won a gold at the 1972 Summer Olympics
 Borut Puc (born 1991), tennis player
 Marko Roginić (born 1995), football player
 Rudolf Rupec (1895-1983), footballer who played ten matches for the Austrian national team.
 Luka Šebetić (born 1952), handball player and coach who played with RK Zamet
 Marijan Seđak (born 1976), handball player playing for HC Motor Zaporizhzhia and Croatia's national team
 Nataša Vezmar (born 1976), taekwondo practitioner
 Ognjen Vukojević (born 1983), former football player who played for Dynamo Kyiv and Croatia's national team
 Jelena Zrnić (born 1975), basketball player

Religion

 Stephen II, Bishop of Zagreb (1190-1247)
 Ratko Perić (born 1944), bishop of Mostar-Duvno
 Rudolf Vimer (1863-1933),  writer, polyglot, benefactor, prebendary, rector of the University of Zagreb, dean of the Catholic Faculty of Theology

Other

 Dragutin Wolf (1866-1927), industrialist
 David Frankfurter (1909-1982), assassin of Swiss Nazi Wilhelm Gustloff
 Josip Reihl-Kir (1955-1991), police officer known for his peacemaking initiatives in the opening stages of the Croatian War of Independence
 Lavoslav Singer (1866-1942), industrialist

References

 
Bjelovar-Bilogora County